Akushinsky District is an administrative and municipal district (raion), one of the forty-one in the Republic of Dagestan, Russia. It is located in the southern central part of the republic. Its administrative center is the rural locality (a selo) of Akusha. As of the 2010 Census, the total population of the district was 52,558, with the population of Akusha accounting for 8.8% of that number.

Administrative and municipal status
Within the framework of administrative divisions, Akushinsky District is one of the forty-one in the Republic of Dagestan. The district is divided into thirteen selsoviets which comprise eighty rural localities.  As a municipal division, the district is incorporated as Akushinsky Municipal District. Its thirteen selsoviets are incorporated as twenty-five rural settlements within the municipal district. The selo of Akusha serves as the administrative center of both the administrative and municipal district.

References

Notes

Sources

Districts of Dagestan
